OBH Nordica is a Nordic company headquartered in Sweden with subsidiaries in Denmark, Finland and Norway, which produces a broad range of products, including within the categories of personal care, clocks, weather stations, cooking utilities, and draft beer dispensers. Some products sold as OBH Nordica are rebranded versions of products from parent company Tefal.

History 
The company was created in a 2002 fusion between the Danish Ole Bødtcher-Hansen A/S (OBH) and the Swedish Joffe Marketing AB.

Bertil Joffe AB was founded by Bertil Joffe in 1959 in Sweden.

Ole Bødtcher-Hansen A/S (OBH) was founded in Denmark in 1985.

References 

2002 establishments in Denmark